Wu Di and Zhang Zhizhen were the defending champions but only Wu chose to defend his title, partnering Wu Yibing. Wu lost in the quarterfinals to Quentin Halys and Calvin Hemery.

Gong Maoxin and Zhang Ze won the title after defeating Ruben Gonzales and Christopher Rungkat 3–6, 7–6(9–7), [10–7] in the final.

Seeds

Draw

References
 Main Draw

ATP Challenger China International - Nanchang - Doubles
2018 Doubles